More George Thorogood and the Destroyers is the fourth album by George Thorogood and The Destroyers, released in 1980.  An alternate name for the album is I'm Wanted.

Track listing
"I'm Wanted" (Willie Dixon) – 4:05
"Kids from Philly" (George Thorogood) – 2:30
"One Way Ticket" (John Lee Hooker) – 4:33
"Bottom of the Sea" (McKinley Morganfield) – 3:30
"Night Time" (Bob Feldman, Jerry Goldstein, Richard Gottehrer) – 3:03
"Tip on In" (James Moore) – 3:01
"Goodbye Baby" (Elmore James) – 4:18
"House of Blue Lights" (Don Raye, Freddie Slack) – 3:03
"Just Can't Make It" (Hound Dog Taylor) – 3:03
"Restless" (Carl Perkins) – 3:14

Personnel

Musicians
George Thorogood – guitar, vocals
Billy Blough – bass guitar
Jeff Simon – drums
Hank Carter – saxophone

Technical
John Nagy – producer, engineer
Paul Mufson – assistant engineer
Dave Crawford – mastering
Susan Marsh – design
David Gahr – photography (front cover)
Rainer Schutz – photography (back cover - color)
David Wilds – photography (back cover - b/w)

Charts

Certifications and sales

References

1980 albums
George Thorogood and the Destroyers albums
Rounder Records albums